Viktor Trokhymovych Fomin (born 13 January 1929 in Sloviansk; died 29 December 2007) was a Ukrainian football player. Master of Sports of the USSR (1970). The first Ukrainian Player of the year (1950).

Honours
 Soviet Cup winner: 1954.

International career
Fomin made his debut for USSR on 26 June 1955 in an away friendly game against Sweden in Stockholm when he came out as substitute on the 41st minute (the Soviet Union won the game 6:0). He played in a 1958 FIFA World Cup qualifier, but was not selected to the final tournament squad. He also participated in the away game against Bulgaria (21 July 1955 USSR 4:0) and Finland at Dynamo Stadium in Moscow (27 July 1955 USSR 2:1). In Bulgaria he also came out as a substitute on the 25th minute while playing a full game against Finland. Fomin participated in one unofficial friendly on 27 February 1955 in India where the Soviet Union was victorious 3:0. He played all 90 minutes of play-time.

In 1956 Fomin played couple of games for Ukraine at the Spartakiad of the Peoples of the USSR.

References

External links
 Profile 

Soviet footballers
Soviet Union international footballers
Ukrainian footballers
FC Shakhtar Donetsk players
FC Dynamo Kyiv players
FC Arsenal Kyiv players
FC Nyva Vinnytsia players
FC Chayka Sevastopol managers
FC Metalurh Zaporizhzhia managers
MFC Mykolaiv managers
FC Spartak Ivano-Frankivsk managers
FC CSKA Kyiv managers
FC Kremin Kremenchuk managers
Soviet football managers
Ukrainian football managers
1929 births
2007 deaths
People from Sloviansk
Association football forwards
Sportspeople from Donetsk Oblast